This is a list of golfers who have won 10 or more events on the Japan Golf Tour since it was established in 1973. The official Japan Golf Tour website lists winners beginning with the 1985 season. Individual player pages, however, list the total number of career wins under "Lifetime Record".

Many of the players on the list have won events on other tours and unofficial events.

This list is up to date as of 2 March 2023.

References

External links
Japan Golf Tour's official site

Japan
 
Japan Golf Tour